Ahmed Ben Said Jaffar (born 1966) is a Comorian politician. He was the foreign minister of the country 28 May 2006 to 2010, when he was replaced by Fahmi Said Ibrahim El Maceli.

References

External links

Who'sWho page

1966 births
Living people
Foreign ministers of the Comoros
Government ministers of the Comoros
Comorian diplomats